Mădălin Florin Martin (born 21 June 1992) is a Romanian professional footballer who plays as a forward for Axiopolis Cernavodă.

References

External links
 
 

1992 births
Living people
People from Teleorman County
Romanian footballers
Association football forwards
Romania under-21 international footballers
Liga I players
Liga II players
FC Rapid București players
FC Politehnica Iași (2010) players
FC Metaloglobus București players
FC Argeș Pitești players
ASC Daco-Getica București players
FCV Farul Constanța players